Westergaardodina is a species-rich genus of spine, U or W-shaped paraconodont known from Middle Cambrian to Lower Ordovician strata.

Use in stratigraphy 
Paibi, a village in Hunan, China, is the location of the Global Boundary Stratotype Section and Point (GSSP) which marks the boundary between the Miaolingian and Furongian epochs of the Cambrian Period on the geologic time scale. The GSSP was ratified by the International Union of Geological Sciences in late 2003. It established the first formally agreed upon subdivision of the Cambrian. Markers which occur near the boundary include the first appearance of Westergaardodina proligula and the Steptoean positive carbon isotope excursion, a large positive shift in carbon-13 isotopes.

References

External links 
 

Paraconodontida
Conodont genera
Cambrian conodonts
Ordovician conodonts
Fossils of Denmark
Fossils of China
Fossils of Canada
Cambrian first appearances
Ordovician extinctions
Paleozoic life of Newfoundland and Labrador